Bob Howe and Lorraine Coghlan were the defending champions, but Coghlan did not compete. Howe partnered with Sally Moore but lost in the quarterfinals to Bob Mark and Jeanne Arth.

Rod Laver and Darlene Hard defeated Neale Fraser and Maria Bueno in the final, 6–4, 6–3 to win the mixed doubles tennis title at the 1959 Wimbledon Championships.

Seeds

  Billy Knight /  Yola Ramírez (semifinals)
  Neale Fraser /  Maria Bueno (final)
  Rod Laver /  Darlene Hard (champions)
  Bob Howe /  Sally Moore (quarterfinals)

Draw

Finals

Top half

Section 1

Section 2

Section 3

Section 4

Bottom half

Section 5

Section 6

Section 7

Section 8

References

External links

X=Mixed Doubles
Wimbledon Championship by year – Mixed doubles